The Talchako River is a river in the Bella Coola Valley of the Central Coast region of British Columbia, Canada.  It meets the Atnarko River at the community of Stuie to form the Bella Coola River.

References

Bella Coola Valley
Pacific Ranges
Rivers of the Pacific Ranges
Range 3 Coast Land District